The 2009 Richmond Spiders football team represented the University of Richmond during the 2009 NCAA Division I FCS football season. Richmond competed as a member of the Colonial Athletic Association (CAA) under second-year head football coach Mike London and played its home games at University of Richmond Stadium. The 2009 campaign came on the heels of an NCAA Division I FCS national championship in 2008.  With the win over William & Mary on November 21, the Spiders recorded their first ten-win regular season in school history.

Schedule

References

Richmond
Richmond Spiders football seasons
Colonial Athletic Association football champion seasons
Richmond Spiders football